Psyche Abandoned is an 1819 white marble sculpture by the Italian sculptor Pietro Tenerani (1789-1869). There are several replicas of the work, but the original is in the Uffizi in Florence. It is notable as one of the most famous Neoclassical Italian sculptures and one of the most notable works of Tenerani, one of the most acclaimed artists of the Italian 'purismo' style.

References

Sculptures of the Uffizi
1819 sculptures